John Michael Edward Seymour, 19th Duke of Somerset  (born 30 December 1952), styled Lord Seymour between 1954 and 1984, is a British aristocratic landowner in Wiltshire and Devon, and a member of the House of Lords.

Life
Educated at Hawtreys and Eton College, he qualified as a chartered surveyor before succeeding to the dukedom in 1984 on the death of his father. Having lost his seat in the House of Lords under the House of Lords Act 1999, he was elected at the December 2014 House of Lords by-elections, to sit as a crossbencher.

The Duke's principal seat is Bradley House, Maiden Bradley, Wiltshire, and he also owns Berry Pomeroy Castle in Devon.

He was appointed a Deputy Lieutenant for Wiltshire in 1993 and for Devon in 2003.

The Duke and his wife are patrons and official hosts of the Queen Charlotte's Ball.

In 2015, the Duke was involved in a dispute over a plan to build housing on ancestral land he owns at Totnes, Devon.

Family
The present Duke is the son of Percy Seymour, 18th Duke of Somerset, and Jane née Thomas (died 2005). His paternal grandmother, Edith Mary Parker, was a daughter of William Parker and Lucinda Steeves, daughter of William Steeves, one of the Fathers of Canadian Confederation.

He married at All Saints' Church, Maiden Bradley, on 20 May 1978, Judith-Rose Hull, daughter of John Folliott Hull; the Duke and Duchess have four children:
Sebastian Edward, Lord Seymour (b. 3 February 1982) married Arlette Marie Léontine (daughter of Daniel Lafayeedney [born Daniel Edney],) on 27 August 2006 and they were divorced in 2011. 
Lady Sophia Rose Seymour (b. 1987)
Lady Henrietta Charlotte Seymour (b. 1989)
Lord Charles Thomas George Seymour (b. 1992).

Arms

Family tree

See also 

 Duke of Somerset
 Seymour baronets
 List of dukes in the peerages of the British Isles
 Somerset House

References

Footnotes

External links
 Burke's Peerage & Baronetage
 Cracroft's Peerage online
 The Duke of Somerset, Obituary in The Times, Saturday, 17 November 1984
 www.duchyofsomerset.co.uk
 
 John Seymour, 19th Duke of Somerset

1952 births
Living people
People educated at Hawtreys
People educated at Eton College
Crossbench hereditary peers
519
Deputy Lieutenants of Devon
Deputy Lieutenants of Wiltshire
21st-century British landowners
John
UK Independence Party politicians
British surveyors
Somerset
Somerset